Kostner is a German and Dutch surname and also a germanised version of the Ladin surname Costa.

Notable people

Kostner
Carolina Kostner (born 1987), an Italian figure skater
Isolde Kostner (born 1975), an Italian Alpine skier
Michael Kostner (born 1969), a German football coach and a player
Walter Kostner (born 1947), an Italian artist

Costner
Brandon Costner (born 1987), basketball player
Chris Costner Sizemore (1927–2016), multiple personality disorder sufferer
George Costner (1923—2002), boxer
Kevin Costner (born 1955), actor and director
Michael Costner, fictional character

See also
Kostner (CTA), a station on the Chicago Transit Authority 's 'L' system
Kostner (CTA Congress Line), an abandoned rapid transit station in the West Garfield Park neighborhood of Chicago, Illinois
Costner
Köstner
Kastner
Kästner
Kestner

Rhaeto-Romance surnames
Germanic-language surnames
Surnames of Italian origin